Rafic may refer to:

Rafic Charaf (1932–2003), Lebanese painter
Rafic Hariri (1944–2005), Prime Minister of Lebanon, 1992–1998 and 2000–2004
Rafic Nahra (born 1959), Lebanese priest of the Catholic Church
Mayan Rafic (born 1995), Israeli windsurfer

See also
Beirut - Rafic Hariri International Airport (IATA: BEY, ICAO: OLBA)
Rafic Hariri Stadium, multi-use stadium in the Manara district of Beirut, Lebanon
Rafik
Rafiq
Refik